Carl Leopold Sjöberg (28 May 1861 – 26 January 1900) was a Swedish composer. His song "Tonerna" ("Visions") was a staple of the famous tenor Jussi Björling and still appears in the concert repertory.

Swedish composers
Swedish male composers
1861 births
1900 deaths
19th-century composers
Burials at Uppsala old cemetery
19th-century male musicians